Amirkhan Kamizovich Shomakhov (− 13 July 1988) was a Soviet Kabardian lyrics, prose, and play writer, primarily known as one of the founders of the Kabardian children's literature. People's Poet of the Kabarda-Balkar ASSR (1977). Member of the Union of Soviet Writers since 1949. Member of the CPSU since 1938.

Biography 
Amirkhan Shomakhov was born in the village of Kanshuei of the Terskaya oblast of the Russian Empire (in what is now Nizhnii Kurp of the Tersky District of the Kabardino-Balkar Republic, Russian Federation).

Education 
In his early childhood Shomakhov studied at a madrasa in his native village. After the October Revolution he finished a primary school and entered a secondary educational institution called The Lenin's Campus in the city of Nalchik. In 1933 he graduated from the Northern Caucasus Pedagogical Institute in Ordzhonikidze (Vladikavkaz, North Ossetia-Alania). In 1955 he also finished the Higher Party School of the Central Committee of the CPSU.

Employment 
During his lifetime Amirkhan Shomakhov worked as lecturer, editor, and official in governmental and civic institutions.

 1933-1936 Nalchik Pedagogical College (teacher, deputy principal, principal)
 1935-1936 Military service
 1938-1940 Republican newspaper (editor-in-chief)
 1941-1941 CPSU committee of the Baksansky District, KBR (chairman)
 1941-1943 People's Commissariat of Education of KBR (comissar)
 1943-1945 Republican newspaper, KBR (editor-in-chief)
 1945-1946 CPSU committee of the Baksansky District, KBR (chairman)
 1947-1949 Kabardian Publishing House (director)
 1949-1952 Ministry of Education of KBR (minister)
 1952-1955 All-Union Znanie Society, KBR (executive secretary)
 1955-1957 Republican newspaper, KBR (vice editor-in-chief) 
 1957-1960 Literary magazine «Oshkhamahue», KBR (editor-in-chief)
 1965-1970 Republican Union of Writers, KBR (executive secretary)

Literary works

Trial of the pen 
For the first time Shomakhov's lyrics saw the light of the day in 1933 (in a literary collection «First Step»).

Prose 
Shomakhov is the author of novels Kolkhoz Under Fire (1958) and Dawn Over the Terek (1968; Russian translation, 1972). The former tells about the events of the war years, and the latter concerns the Civil War and the first years of Soviet power in the Kabardian Republic. He also wrote a novel titled Horsemen on the Peaks (1970), about formation of the working class in Kabardino-Balkaria.

Poetry for Children 
Amirkhan Shomakhov was truly a dedicated kids writer. A Moscow publishing house «Detskaya Literatura» in 1969 highly appraised his poem «Scouts». In 1970 he was nominated for the State award named after N. Krupskaya. His books have been translated into many of the languages of the peoples of the Soviet Union. Here is an abstract from his poemette translated to English by Margaret Wettlin:

POOR LITTLE MUKHADIN

Always something bad befalls me,
I'm always on the outs with luck,
Every day the teacher calls me
To the board, and there I'm stuck.

Yesterday I couldn't tell her
Where our country gets its tea,
I lost my pen, I lost my speller —
What a life for such as me!

Family 

Father: Kamiza Shomakhov. 
Mother: Maksidova Guashane.
Wife: Lyolya Kupova  − 26 January 1999.
 Amirkhan and Lyolya had 2 children: the daughter, Tamara and the son, Sultan.

Honours and awards

Titles of honor 
 Honored Man of Art of Kabardino-Balkaria (1949).
 People's Poet of Kabardino-Balkaria (1977).

Decorations 
   Medal "For the Defence of the Caucasus" (1944).
   Medal "For Valiant Labour in the Great Patriotic War 1941–1945" (1945).
   Order of the Badge of Honour (1957).
   Order of the Badge of Honour (1970).
   Medal "In Commemoration of the 100th Anniversary of the Birth of Vladimir Ilyich Lenin" (1970).
   Medal "Thirty Years of Victory in the Great Patriotic War 1941–1945" (1976).

Memory 
 The City Council of Nalchik, on the occasion of the 100th anniversary of Amirkhan Shomakhov's birth, disposed to erect a commemorative plaque on the facade of the poet's residence house.

Bibliography 
 The Great Soviet Encyclopedia / ed. Marron Waxman. - 3-rd Edition. - New York : Mac-Millan, Inc., 1970—1979;
 Kozhevnikov, V., Nikolaeva P., Literary Encyclopedic Dictionary, Soviet Encyclopedia, Moscow, 1987;
 Kodzokova, L.R., Kabardian Poetry for Children of the Present Period: Topics and Poetics // Current Problems of the Humanitarian and Natural sciences. Moscow. – 2017. – No. 7;
 Writers of Kabardino-Balkaria (XIXc. - end of 80-s of XXc.). Bibliographic Dictionary / ed. Khazhkhozheva, R.H., Nalchik: El-Fa, 2003;;
 Maksidova, A.A., Maksidovs' Genealogical Line, in Genealogy of the North Caucasus. No. 10. – Nalchik, 2004;.

References

Russian children's writers
Russian lyricists
Soviet children's writers
Soviet male writers
20th-century Russian male writers
Soviet poets
Russian male poets
Communist Party of the Soviet Union members
1910 births
1988 deaths